The 2001 NASCAR Busch Series began February 17 and ended November 10. Kevin Harvick of Richard Childress Racing was champion.

Teams and drivers

Full schedule

Limited schedule 

Notes: 
 If under "team", the owner's name is listed and in italics, that means the name of the race team that fielded the car is unknown.

Races

NAPA Auto Parts 300 

The NAPA Auto Parts 300 was held February 17 at Daytona International Speedway. Joe Nemechek won the pole.

Top ten results

Failed to qualify: Christian Elder (#38), Andy Kirby (#49)

Alltel 200 

The Alltel 200 was held February 24 at North Carolina Speedway. Greg Biffle won the pole.

Top ten results

Failed to qualify: none

Sam's Town 300 

The Sam's Town 300 was held March 3 at Las Vegas Motor Speedway. Matt Kenseth won the pole.

Top ten results

Failed to qualify: none

Aaron's 312 

The Aaron's 312 was held March 12 at Atlanta Motor Speedway. Ryan Newman won the pole.

Top ten results

87-Joe Nemechek
60-Greg Biffle
99-Michael Waltrip
10-Jeff Green
00-Todd Bodine
18-Jeff Purvis
57-Jason Keller
2-Kevin Harvick
92-Jimmie Johnson
33-Tony Raines

Failed to qualify: none

SunCom 200 

The SunCom 200 was held March 17 at Darlington Raceway. Ryan Newman won the pole.

Top ten results

10-Jeff Green
17-Matt Kenseth
57-Jason Keller
48-Kenny Wallace
20-Mike McLaughlin
26-Bobby Hamilton Jr.
31-Steve Park
2-Kevin Harvick
98-Elton Sawyer
18-Jeff Purvis

Failed to qualify: none

Cheez-It 250 

The Cheez-It 250 was held March 24 at Bristol Motor Speedway. Kevin Harvick won the pole.

Top ten results

17-Matt Kenseth
66-Tim Fedewa
7-Randy LaJoie
92-Jimmie Johnson
48-Kenny Wallace
02-Ryan Newman
2-Kevin Harvick
33-Tony Raines
61-Tim Sauter
99-Michael Waltrip

Failed to qualify: none

Jani-King 300 

The Jani-King 300 was held March 31 at Texas Motor Speedway. Matt Kenseth won the pole.

Top ten results

2-Kevin Harvick
9-Jeff Burton
43-Jay Sauter
87-Joe Nemechek
17-Matt Kenseth
34-David Green
60-Greg Biffle
92-Jimmie Johnson
21-Mike Skinner
71-Kevin Lepage

Failed to qualify: Mike Harmon (#44)

Pepsi 300 

The inaugural Pepsi 300 was held April 14 at Nashville Superspeedway. Kevin Harvick won the pole.

Top ten results

60-Greg Biffle
57-Jason Keller
23-Scott Wimmer
7-Randy LaJoie
98-Elton Sawyer
21-Mike Skinner
2-Kevin Harvick
10-Jeff Green
20-Mike McLaughlin
00-Todd Bodine

 This was Biffle’s first of 20 career Busch Series wins.

Failed to qualify: none

Subway 300 

The Subway 300 was held April 21 at Talladega Superspeedway. Joe Nemechek won the pole.

Top ten results

20-Mike McLaughlin
1-Jimmy Spencer
10-Jeff Green
00-Todd Bodine
21-Mike Skinner
98-Elton Sawyer
43-Jay Sauter
37-Kevin Grubb
60-Greg Biffle
48-Kenny Wallace

The race was marred for a big wreck which wrecked multiple cars.
This would turn out to be McLaughlin’s sixth and final Busch Series win. The win was controversial, as McLaughlin was deemed by Spencer to have swerved his car below the yellow line to block other cars; NASCAR instituted track limits on Talladega and Daytona in all top three series (referred to as the "yellow line rule") following the race.

Failed to qualify: none

Auto Club 300 

The Auto Club 300 was held April 28 at California Speedway. Bobby Hamilton Jr. won the pole.

Top ten results

36-Hank Parker Jr.
18-Jeff Purvis
10-Jeff Green
71-Kevin Lepage
2-Kevin Harvick
60-Greg Biffle
1-Jimmy Spencer
33-Tony Raines
87-Joe Nemechek
20-Mike McLaughlin

Failed to qualify: none

This was Hank Parker Jr.’s first of 2 Busch Series wins.

Hardee's 250 

The Hardee's 250 was held May 4 at Richmond International Raceway. Matt Kenseth won the pole.

Top ten results

1-Jimmy Spencer
33-Tony Raines
21-Mike Skinner
17-Matt Kenseth
2-Kevin Harvick
10-Jeff Greenn
23-Scott Wimmer
48-Kenny Wallace
31-Steve Park
43-Jay Sauter

Failed to qualify: none

CVS Pharmacy 200 presented by Bayer 

The CVS Pharmacy 200 presented by Bayer was held May 12 at New Hampshire International Speedway. Kevin Harvick won the pole.

Top ten results

57-Jason Keller
2-Kevin Harvick
21-Mike Skinner
10-Jeff Green
48-Kenny Wallace
31-Steve Park
26-Bobby Hamilton Jr.
7-Randy LaJoie
98-Elton Sawyer
20-Mike McLaughlin

Failed to qualify: none

Nazareth 200 

The Nazareth 200 was held May 20 at Nazareth Speedway. Tony Raines won the pole.

Top ten results

60-Greg Biffle
2-Kevin Harvick
10-Jeff Green
57-Jason Keller
66-Tim Fedewa
33-Tony Raines
26-Bobby Hamilton Jr.
59-Rich Bickle
92-Jimmie Johnson
27-Jamie McMurray

Failed to qualify: none

Carquest Auto Parts 300 

The Carquest Auto Parts 300 was held May 26 at Lowe's Motor Speedway. Kevin Harvick won the pole.

Top ten results

10-Jeff Green
17-Matt Kenseth
57-Jason Keller
00-Todd Bodine
21-Mike Skinner
60-Greg Biffle
9-Jeff Burton
1-Jimmy Spencer
34-David Green
18-Jeff Purvis

Failed to qualify: Dan Pardus (#32), Rich Woodland Jr. (#40), Dave Blaney (#93), Dwayne Leik (#81)

MBNA Platinum 200 

The MBNA Platinum 200 was held June 2 at Dover International Speedway. Jeff Green won the pole.

Top ten results

1-Jimmy Spencer
17-Matt Kenseth
2-Kevin Harvick
21-Mike Skinner
31-Steve Park
98-Elton Sawyer
23-Scott Wimmer
34-David Green
60-Greg Biffle
33-Tony Raines

Failed to qualify: none

Outback Steakhouse 300 

The inaugural Outback Steakhouse 300 was held June 16 at Kentucky Speedway. Jay Sauter won the pole. In his first Busch Series start, Travis Kvapil flipped. Tim Sauter suffered a 60-point penalty after an illegal rollcage was found on his car after the race.

Top ten results

2-Kevin Harvick
60-Greg Biffle
33-Tony Raines
98-Elton Sawyer
46-Ashton Lewis
74-Chad Little
7-Randy LaJoie
37-Kevin Grubb
43-Jay Sauter
27-Jamie McMurray

Failed to qualify: Dan Pardus (#32), Jeff Falk (#8), Mike Harmon (#44)

GNC Live Well 250 

The GNC Live Well 250 was held July 1 at The Milwaukee Mile. Kevin Harvick won the pole.

Top ten results

60-Greg Biffle
17-Matt Kenseth
37-Kevin Grubb
2-Kevin Harvick
57-Jason Keller
98-Elton Sawyer
18-Jeff Purvis
11-Ron Hornaday Jr.
10-Jeff Green
33-Tony Raines

Failed to qualify: none

GNC Live Well 200 

The GNC Live Well 200 was held July 8 at Watkins Glen International. Scott Pruett won the pole.

Top ten results

87-Ron Fellows
60-Greg Biffle
2-Kevin Harvick
17-Boris Said
21-Robby Gordon
98-Elton Sawyer
35-Lyndon Amick
71-Scott Pruett
57-Jason Keller
11-Ron Hornaday Jr.

Failed to qualify: none

Sam's Club presents the Hill Bros. Coffee 300 

The inaugural Sam's Club presents the Hill Bros. Coffee 300 was held July 14 at Chicagoland Speedway. Ryan Newman won the pole.

Top ten results

92-Jimmie Johnson
21-Mike Skinner
9-Jeff Burton
87-Joe Nemechek
57-Jason Keller
10-Jeff Green
00-Buckshot Jones
98-Elton Sawyer
37-Kevin Grubb
71-Kevin Lepage

Failed to qualify: Mike Harmon (#44), Rich Woodland Jr. (#40)

This race stands as Jimmie Johnson’s lone Busch Series victory.

Carquest Auto Parts 250 

The Carquest Auto Parts 250 was held July 21 at Gateway International Raceway. Greg Biffle won the pole.

Top ten results

2-Kevin Harvick
57-Jason Keller
37-Kevin Grubb
60-Greg Biffle
10-Jeff Green
48-Kenny Wallace
37-David Green
98-Elton Sawyer
7-Randy LaJoie
23-Scott Wimmer

Failed to qualify: Mark Voigt (#30)

NAPA Autocare 250 

The NAPA Autocare 250 was held July 28 at Pikes Peak International Raceway. Kenny Wallace won the pole.

Top ten results

21-Jeff Purvis
10-Jeff Green
2-Kevin Harvick
57-Jason Keller
60-Greg Biffle
37-David Green
92-Jimmie Johnson
37-Kevin Grubb
48-Kenny Wallace
00-Tim Fedewa

Failed to qualify: Mark Voigt (#30)

Kroger 200 

The Kroger 200 was held August 4 at Indianapolis Raceway Park. Kenny Wallace won the pole.

Top ten results

2-Kevin Harvick
60-Greg Biffle
74-Chad Little
98-Elton Sawyer
57-Jason Keller
10-Jeff Green
00-Tim Fedewa
66-Geoff Bodine
59-Rich Bickle
27-Jamie McMurray

Failed to qualify: Wayman Wittman (#93), Mardy Lindley (#89)

NAPAonline.com 250 

The NAPAonline.com 250 was held August 18 at Michigan International Speedway. Jimmy Spencer won the pole.

Top ten results

02-Ryan Newman
2-Kevin Harvick
33-Tony Raines
92-Jimmie Johnson
18-Mike McLaughlin
21-Mike Skinner
98-Elton Sawyer
57-Jason Keller
00-Tim Fedewa
9-Jeff Burton

Failed to qualify: Dwayne Leik (#81)

This was Newman’s 1st of 7 Busch Series victories as well as the first for Team Penske.

Food City 250 

The Food City 250 was held August 24 at Bristol Motor Speedway. Mike Skinner won the pole.

Top ten results

2-Kevin Harvick
10-Jeff Green
48-Kenny Wallace
31-Steve Park
98-Elton Sawyer
23-Scott Wimmer
1-Jimmy Spencer
02-Ryan Newman
74-Chad Little
43-Jay Sauter

Failed to qualify: Nate Monteith (#44), Randy Ratliff (#75), Ron Young (#71)

South Carolina 200 

The South Carolina 200 was held September 1 at Darlington Raceway. Ryan Newman won the pole. On lap 19 of this race, Steve Park lost control of his race car under caution and was T-boned by rookie Larry Foyt. Park suffered near-fatal injuries that made him miss the remainder of the 2001 racing season and the 2002 Daytona 500.

Top ten results

9-Jeff Burton
98-Elton Sawyer
18-Mike McLaughlin
02-Ryan Newman
26-Bobby Hamilton Jr.
57-Jason Keller
17-Matt Kenseth
1-Jimmy Spencer
10-Jeff Green
33-Tony Raines

Failed to qualify: none

Autolite / Fram 250 

The Autolite / Fram 250 was held September 7 at Richmond International Raceway. Jeff Green won the pole. During the race, Greg Biffle and Jay Sauter tangled, resulting in Biffle running from his car to punch Sauter. Both drivers were given a 100-point penalty for their actions.

Top ten results

1-Jimmy Spencer
17-Matt Kenseth
37-Kevin Grubb
66-Geoff Bodine
21-Johnny Sauter
74-Chad Little
02-Ryan Newman
98-Elton Sawyer
9-Jeff Burton
4-Mike Wallace

Failed to qualify: Steven Christian (#94), Randy Ratliff (#75), Dion Cicarelli (#84), A. J. Alsup (#72), Ron Young (#71), Robbie Faggart (#97), Chad Chaffin (#16), Jeff Oakley (#96), Eddie Beahr (#5)

MBNA.com 200 

The MBNA.com 200 was held September 22 at Dover International Speedway. Ryan Newman won the pole.

Top ten results

10-Jeff Green
48-Kenny Wallace
1-Jimmy Spencer
74-Chad Little
60-Greg Biffle
71-Kevin Lepage
33-Tony Raines
36-Hank Parker Jr.
7-Randy LaJoie
17-Matt Kenseth

Failed to qualify: none

Mr. Goodcents 300 

The inaugural Mr. Goodcents 300 was held September 29 at Kansas Speedway. Kevin Lepage won the pole.

Top ten results

10-Jeff Green
36-Hank Parker Jr.
60-Greg Biffle
17-Matt Kenseth
57-Jason Keller
92-Jimmie Johnson
33-Tony Raines
00-Buckshot Jones
59-Mark Green
18-Mike McLaughlin

Failed to qualify: Mike Swaim Jr. (#12), Jason Rudd (#85), A. J. Alsup (#72)

Little Trees 300 

The Little Trees 300 was held October 6 at Lowe's Motor Speedway. Jeff Burton won the pole.

Top ten results

60-Greg Biffle
57-Jason Keller
9-Jeff Burton
2-Kevin Harvick
46-Ashton Lewis
1-Jimmy Spencer
36-Hank Parker Jr.
5-Ward Burton
98-Elton Sawyer
10-Jeff Green

Failed to qualify: Jeff Fultz (#86), Dwayne Leik (#81), Jason Rudd (#85), J. R. Robbs (#89), Josh Richeson (#6)

Sam's Town 250 

The Sam's Town 250 was held October 13 at Memphis Motorsports Park. Kevin Harvick won the pole. The race was supposed to be tape delayed and shown on TNT after the Cup race, but due to rain that also delayed the Winston Cup race at Martinsville, NBC showed this race live instead.

Top ten results

7-Randy LaJoie
10-Jeff Green
2-Kevin Harvick
43-Jay Sauter
59-Jeff Purvis
11-Tim Fedewa
57-Jason Keller
23-Scott Wimmer
46-Ashton Lewis
18-Mike McLaughlin

Failed to qualify: Sammy Ragan (#78)

This was LaJoie’s 15th and final win.

Outback Steakhouse 200 

The Outback Steakhouse 200 was held October 27 at Phoenix International Raceway. Jimmy Spencer won the pole.

Top ten results

60-Greg Biffle
10-Jeff Green
2-Kevin Harvick
43-Ron Hornaday Jr.
92-Todd Bodine
57-Jason Keller
23-Scott Wimmer
36-Hank Parker Jr.
9-Jeff Burton
48-Kenny Wallace

Failed to qualify: Lance Hooper (#75), Damon Lusk (#80)

Sam's Club 200 

The Sam's Club 200 was held November 3 at North Carolina Speedway. Ryan Newman won the pole.

Top ten results

48-Kenny Wallace
17-Matt Kenseth
18-Mike McLaughlin
57-Jason Keller
2-Kevin Harvick
34-David Green
02-Ryan Newman
36-Hank Parker Jr.
10-Jeff Green
98-Elton Sawyer 1 lap down

Failed to qualify: Scott Hansen (#75), Drew White (#22)

Harvick's fifth-place finish was good enough to clinch the 2001 NASCAR Busch Series champion by 156 points over Jeff Green.
This was Kenny Wallace's final Busch Series win.

GNC Live Well 300 

The GNC Live Well 300 was held November 10 at Homestead-Miami Speedway. Jeff Green won the pole.

Top ten results

87-Joe Nemechek
98-Elton Sawyer
60-Greg Biffle
23-Scott Wimmer
17-Matt Kenseth
99-Michael Waltrip
5-Ward Burton
02-Ryan Newman
10-Jeff Green
59-Stacy Compton

Failed to qualify: Morgan Shepherd (#89), Tim Fedewa (#12), Martin Truex Jr. (#56), Dan Pardus (#32), Jeff Fultz (#86), Ron Young (#71), Tom Carey Jr. (#01), Mike Harmon (#44), Michael Dokken (#8), Dion Ciccarelli (#84), Brian Tyler (#94), Danny Bagwell (#22)

Full Drivers' Championship

(key) Bold – Pole position awarded by time. Italics – Pole position set by owner's points. * – Most laps led.

Rookie of the Year 
Greg Biffle of Roush Racing won the Rookie of the Year title in 2001, winning a record five races and finishing fourth in points, in addition to leading the championship standings at one point in the season. Runner-up was Scott Wimmer, who finished twenty-six points out of tenth in final standings. Jamie McMurray and Larry Foyt finished 3rd and 4th respectively, while Kelly Denton and Christian Elder signed to run limited schedules with their teams. Marty Houston, Tim Sauter, and David Donohue were either released during the season or had their team shut down due to sponsor issues.

See also 
 2001 NASCAR Winston Cup Series
 2001 NASCAR Craftsman Truck Series

External links 
Busch Series standings and statistics for 2001

NASCAR Xfinity Series seasons